J.-Georges Ratelle (5 June 1883 – 30 August 1969) was a Liberal party member of the House of Commons of Canada. He was born in Saint-Liguori, Quebec and became an insurance broker by career.

He was first elected at the Lafontaine riding in the 1949 general election and held that riding for four terms from the 21st to the 24th Parliaments. Ratelle left federal politics in 1962 and did not seek another term in Parliament.

References

External links
 

1883 births
1969 deaths
Members of the House of Commons of Canada from Quebec
Liberal Party of Canada MPs